Glenn Miller is a former professional rugby league footballer who played in the 1980s and 1990s. He played for the Penrith Panthers from 1986–87 and he was part of the inaugural Newcastle Knights squad from 1988-92.

Playing career
Miller made his first grade debut for Penrith in Round 5 1986 against South Sydney.  In 1988, Miller signed with Newcastle and played in the club's first ever game which was against Parramatta and ended in a 28-4 defeat.

In 1992, Miller played in Newcastle's first ever finals campaign as the club finished 4th.  Miller played in both matches, the 21-2 victory over Western Suburbs and the 3-2 loss to St George.  The defeat by St George in turn was Miller's last game in first grade and he retired at the end of 1992.

Post playing
Miller worked as a  plumber and also was a trade teacher in the plumbing Department at Maitland TAFE, Newcastle N.S.W.

References

External links
http://www.hunter.tafensw.edu.au/on-campus/Pages/Maitland_Campus_Profile.aspx

1964 births
Living people
Australian rugby league players
Newcastle Knights captains
Newcastle Knights players
Penrith Panthers players
Rugby league centres
Rugby league wingers
Place of birth missing (living people)